The Military ranks of Kazakhstan are the military insignia used by the Armed Forces of the Republic of Kazakhstan. Being a former Soviet Republic, Kazakhstan shares a similar rank structure to that of Russia.

Commissioned officers
The rank insignia for commissioned officers for the army, navy and air force respectively.

Enlisted
The rank insignia for enlisted personnel for the army, navy and air force respectively.

References

External links
 Uniforminsignia.org (Kazakh Ground Forces)
 Uniforminsignia.org (Kazakh Naval Forces)
 Uniforminsignia.org (Kazakh Air and Air Defense Forces)

Kazakhstan
Military of Kazakhstan